Release the Prisoners to Spring is a 1975 Swedish comedy film directed by Tage Danielsson. At the 12th Guldbagge Awards the film won the awards for Best Film and Best Actress (Margaretha Krook).

The film stars Ernst-Hugo Järegård as the prisoner Harald Hansson, a break-in expert, who one day meets Frida and her friend and learns how to bake cookies. He considers a career change, especially when he falls in love with Flora, the daughter of a city judge.

The film is a cult comedy by Hasseåtage. Memorable scenes in the film are the car chase with Järegård, the musical show number in the cell performed by Jan Malmsjö, and the show number carried out simultaneously in the exercise yard by Järegård, Malmsjö and Urban Sahlin; and practically every scene with Ekman as the prison governor.

The film was meant to comment on the criminal system and view of criminals in society (both in Sweden and worldwide).

Cast
Ernst-Hugo Järegård as Harald Hansson
Lena Nyman as Frida
Tage Danielsson as her friend
Gösta Ekman as the prison governor; Frans
Margaretha Krook as Flora, the judge's daughter
Jan Malmsjö as "the Professor"
Georg Årlin as the judge
Hans Alfredson as Erlandsson
Urban Sahlin as "the Monkey"

References

External links
 
 
 

1975 films
1975 comedy films
Swedish comedy films
1970s Swedish-language films
Films directed by Tage Danielsson
1970s prison films
Best Film Guldbagge Award winners
1970s Swedish films